Valérie Hould-Marchand (born May 29, 1980 in Rivière-du-Loup, Quebec, Canada) is a retired Canadian synchronized swimmer and Olympic medalist.

Career
Hould-Marchand was a member of the Canadian team that received a silver medal in the team event at the age of 16 at the 1996 Summer Olympics in Atlanta. She would go on to win gold in two major competitions, the 1998 Commonwealth Games in the solo event and 1999 Pan American Games in the team event. She became embroiled in a dispute with the national synchronized swimming organization when they prevented her from training her solo routine, despite already being selected to compete in the 2000 Summer Olympics, Hould-Marchard fought for her rights but was officially retired for doing so despite strict instructions from the sport minister of Canada not to do so. A committee was born out of this battle in order to give a safe haven to athletes to be heard without putting their career at risk.

References

External links
Olympic Info

1980 births
Canadian synchronized swimmers
French Quebecers
Living people
Olympic silver medalists for Canada
Olympic synchronized swimmers of Canada
People from Rivière-du-Loup
Synchronized swimmers at the 1996 Summer Olympics
Olympic medalists in synchronized swimming
Medalists at the 1996 Summer Olympics
Commonwealth Games medallists in synchronised swimming
Commonwealth Games gold medallists for Canada
Pan American Games medalists in synchronized swimming
Synchronized swimmers at the 1999 Pan American Games
Pan American Games gold medalists for Canada
Medalists at the 1999 Pan American Games
Synchronised swimmers at the 1998 Commonwealth Games
21st-century Canadian women
Medallists at the 1998 Commonwealth Games